Anthony Moris (born 29 April 1990) is a professional footballer who plays as a goalkeeper for Belgian First Division A club Union SG. Born in Belgium, he plays for the Luxembourg national team.

Career
He played his first friendly match for Standard Liège against R.F.C. Amay where he kept a clean sheet.

Moris was the  choice goalkeeper for Standard Liège for the 2008–2009 season. He was contracted until 2010 with Standard and extended his contract three more years.

In January 2014, Moris was loaned out to then-Belgian First Division B club Sint-Truiden. He made his competitive debut for the club on 1 February 2014 in a 1–1 home draw with Roeselare, coming on as a 79th-minute substitute for Davy Schollen. He played in just eight more competitive matches during the duration of his loan, with three in the league and five in the playoffs. Moris kept four clean sheets during the loan, including one in his eleven-minute stint on his debut.

In early 2015, Moris was picked up by K.V. Mechelen. He made his league debut for the club on 5 April 2015, coming on as an 88th-minute substitute for Wouter Biebauw in a 4–1 home victory over Waasland-Beveren. On 25 April 2015, in just his third match for the club, Moris suffered a cruciate ligament rupture in his left knee, ending his first season with the club prematurely. In October 2016, in a league match against Anderlecht, Moris tore his meniscus. On 25 March 2017, in a World Cup qualifying match against France, Moris tore his cruciate ligament again, this time in his right knee.

On 18 July 2018, Moris and Mechelen mutually parted ways. The next day, he signed for Belgian First Amateur Division club R.E. Virton on a free transfer. He made his league debut for the club on 1 September 2018, playing all ninety minutes of a 3–0 away victory over Dessel Sport.

Moris signed a three-year deal with Union Saint-Gilloise on 30 July 2020.

International career 
Anthony has represented several youth national teams of Belgium.

Moris who has a Luxembourgish father, declared himself available to play for Luxembourg in late 2013, thus becoming  selectable for Luxembourg national team, the d‘Roud Léiwen (Red Lions).

In February 2014, Anthony Moris was called up for the first time into the Luxembourgish national football team that drew with Cape Verde 0–0. He has been a regular member of the squad for the past six seasons.

Honours 
Belgian Supercup in 2008 with Standard de Liège

References

External links
 
 

1990 births
Living people
People from Arlon
Luxembourgian footballers
Luxembourg international footballers
Belgian footballers
Belgium youth international footballers
Belgian people of Luxembourgian descent
Association football goalkeepers
Standard Liège players
Sint-Truidense V.V. players
K.V. Mechelen players
R.E. Virton players
Royale Union Saint-Gilloise players
Belgian Pro League players
Challenger Pro League players
Footballers from Luxembourg (Belgium)